Krekel is a surname. Notable people with the surname include:

Arnold Krekel (1815–1888), United States federal judge
Hildegard Krekel (1952–2013), German actress
Tim Krekel (1950–2009), American rock musician and country music songwriter

See also
Jan Krekels (born 1947), Dutch cyclist
Krekel van der Woerd Wouterse, defunct Dutch management consulting firm
Tig H Krekel, Served as an Interim Chief Executive Officer of Defense Venture Group, Ltd., as the President and Chief Executive Officer at Hughes Space and Communications, President at Boeing Satellite Systems, Inc., President and the Chief Executive Officer at Aerospace Equipment Systems group of AlliedSignal.

References